The 1987 Matchroom Welsh Professional Championship was a professional non-ranking snooker tournament, which took place between 9 and 13 February 1987 at the Newport Centre in Newport, Wales.

Doug Mountjoy won the tournament defeating Steve Newbury 9–7 in the final.

Main draw

References

Welsh Professional Championship
Welsh Professional Championship
Welsh Professional Championship
Welsh Professional Championship